7: The Best of Stryper is the seventh release and second compilation album by Christian metal band Stryper. Released in 2003, it is the second compilation album produced by the band, and its recording and release led to the reunion of the original members of the band.

Hollywood Records asked the members of Stryper to record new tracks to be placed in a compilation album celebrating the 20th anniversary of the band. Frontman Michael Sweet wrote two new songs that were recorded by the original 4 members of the group. This marked the first time in 12 years that Stryper recorded together in the studio.

After the release of the album, the band went on a 36 show reunion tour, their first in 12 years. Shows were recorded for a live album 7 Weeks: Live in America, 2003, which was released on May 18, 2004.

Track listing
Something (New Track)
For You (New Track)
Shining Star
Lady
All For One
In God We Trust
Always There For You
To Hell With The Devil
Calling On You
Free
Honestly
The Way
Soldiers Under Command
Makes Me Wanna Sing
Reach Out
From Wrong To Right
Loving You
Believe

References 

Stryper albums
2003 greatest hits albums
Heavy metal compilation albums
Glam metal compilation albums